The 2006 Ukrainian Figure Skating Championships took place between 23 and 25 December 2005 in Kyiv. Skaters competed in the disciplines of men's singles, ladies' singles, pair skating, and ice dancing on the senior level. The results of the national championships were used to choose the teams to the 2006 Winter Olympics, the 2006 World Championships, and the 2006 European Championships.

Results

Men

Ladies

Pairs

Ice dancing

External links
 results

Ukrainian Figure Skating Championships
2005 in figure skating
Ukrainian Figure Skating Championships, 2006
2005 in Ukrainian sport
2006 in Ukrainian sport